Severino José Cavalcanti Ferreira (18 December 1930 – 15 July 2020) was a Brazilian politician, born in João Alfredo, Pernambuco. He was a member of the Progressive Party, despite having changed parties eight times in his career. He was the mayor of João Alfredo, a member of the Pernambuco State Assembly and a federal congressman.

In 2005, he ran for the presidency of Brazilian chamber of deputies, thinking that the official candidate of the Lula government, Luiz Eduardo Greenhalgh, would win. However, because of the internal crisis of the government at the time, Cavalcanti was able to take the post.

On 21 September 2005, he resigned from his position as federal deputy, and his position as President of the House was taken over provisionally by the Vice-President of the House José Thomaz Nonô.

In October 2008, Cavalcanti was elected as mayor of João Alfredo.

References

|-

|-

1930 births
2020 deaths
Presidents of the Chamber of Deputies (Brazil)
Mayors of places in Brazil
Progressistas politicians
Brazilian people of Italian descent
Severino
People from Pernambuco